The 1995 Giro di Lombardia was the 89th edition of the Giro di Lombardia cycle race and was held on 21 October 1995. The race started in Varese and finished in Bergamo. The race was won by Gianni Faresin of the Lampre team.

General classification

References

1995
Giro di Lombardia
Giro di Lombardia
Giro di Lombardia
Giro Di Lombardia